Pristimantis rhodostichus is a species of frog in the family Strabomantidae. It is found in the Zamora-Chinchipe Province of southern Ecuador and the Amazonas Department of northern Peru.

Its natural habitat are primary cloud and montane forests. It is threatened by habitat loss caused by agriculture and logging.

References

rhodostichus
Amphibians of Ecuador
Amphibians of Peru
Amphibians described in 1999
Taxonomy articles created by Polbot